For Lovers Only is a 1995 covers/pop standards album by The Temptations for the Motown label, something of a sequel to their 1967 album The Temptations in a Mellow Mood. The album features the final recordings of Melvin Franklin, who fell ill during recording and died before the album's release. Franklin was replaced on the tracks he does not sing on by Parliament-Funkadelic's Ray Davis in his only album appearance with the group. The first single, "Some Enchanted Evening", reached #40 on the Urban Adult Contemporary charts.

The album was also the final Temptations album for Ali-Ollie Woodson, who would be released from the group by Otis Williams in 1996, after having suffered several bouts of throat cancer. For Lovers Only was reissued in 2002 with a bonus track, a remix of "Night & Day" as included on the soundtrack to What Women Want.

Critical reception

AllMusic editor Andrew Hamilton found that For Lovers Only was "arguably the Temptations' best album since Truly for You dropped in 1984." He added: "Richard Perry outdid himself with this production, he expertly captured the essence of the Temptations, regardless of the members, in these songs."

Track listing
All tracks produced by Richard Perry.

Personnel
Ali-Ollie Woodson: vocals (tenor/baritone)
Theo Peoples: vocals (second tenor/baritone)
Otis Williams: vocals (second tenor/baritone)
Ron Tyson: vocals (first tenor/falsetto)
Melvin Franklin: vocals (bass) (only on "Melvin's Interlude" and "Life Is But A Dream")
Ray Davis: vocals (bass) (all except "Melvin's Interlude" and "Life Is But A Dream")

Charts

References

1995 albums
The Temptations albums
Covers albums
Motown albums
Albums arranged by Paul Riser
Albums produced by Richard Perry